The Viking Aircraft Viking II is an American powered parachute designed and produced by Viking Aircraft Inc of Panama City Beach, Florida; part of the Viking-series. Now out of production, when it was available the aircraft was supplied complete and ready-to-fly.

The aircraft was introduced in 2000 and production ended when the company went out of business in 2005.

Design and development
Some were also registered as Experimental aircraft in the U.S. and one as an Experimental - Amateur-built.

The Viking II features a  parachute-style wing, two-seats-in-side-by-side configuration, tricycle landing gear and a twin-cylinder  Rotax 503 engine in pusher configuration. The three-cylinder  2si 690-L70 liquid-cooled engine was a factory option.

The aircraft carriage is built from metal tubing with a composite partial cockpit fairing. In flight steering is accomplished via handles that actuate the canopy brakes, creating roll and yaw. On the ground the aircraft has foot pedal-controlled nosewheel steering. The main landing gear incorporates spring rod suspension.

Operational history
In  September 2015 five examples were registered in the United States with the Federal Aviation Administration, although a total of six had been registered at one time.

Variants
The company also produced a single seat version of the Viking II design, which it referred to simply as the "Single-Place". This version mounts a single seat on a narrower cockpit frame, but is otherwise similar.

Specifications (Viking II)

References

External links
Company website archives on Archive.org

Viking II
2000s United States sport aircraft
2000s United States ultralight aircraft
Single-engined pusher aircraft
Powered parachutes